The Lady Henry Somerset Memorial, also known as the Lady Henry Somerset's Children's Fountain, is a Grade II-listed memorial to Lady Henry Somerset, in the Victoria Embankment Gardens in Westminster, London. It was listed on 24 February 1958.

See also

 List of public art in the City of Westminster

References

External links
 
 Lady Henry Somerset - Victoria Embankment Gardens, London, UK at Waymarking

Drinking fountains in the United Kingdom
Somerset
Monuments and memorials in London
Monuments and memorials to women
Outdoor sculptures in London
Victoria Embankment
Sculptures of women in the United Kingdom